Saccolomataceae is a family of ferns in the order Polypodiales with about 19 species.  It has been formerly treated as part of the Dennstaedtiaceae, however it has been classified as its own family according to Smith et al. (2006) The genus Saccoloma has been classified to include Orthiopteris, but the phylogeny of the group not yet fully understood. The family includes a dozen known species.

Description 

Saccolomataceae generally have the following characteristics: Terrestrial; rhizomes short-creeping to erect and trunk-like; petioles each with an omega-shaped vascular strand; blades pinnate to decompound and lacking articulate hairs; veins free; sori terminal on the veins; indusia pouch- or cup-shaped.

Taxonomy 

In 2016 the Pteridophyte Phylogeny Group placed it as the sole family in the Saccolomatineae, one of six suborders making up the Polypodiales order. These suborders are phylogenetically related as shown in this cladogram:

Distribution 

Saccolomataceae is pantropical.

References

Bibliography

 
 
 
 
 
 
 
 
 
 
 
 , in 

Polypodiales
Fern families
Monogeneric fern families